"American Dream" is a song recorded by American musical duo MKTO. It was released in April 2014 as the fourth single from their debut album MKTO. It was commercially less successful than the previous three singles, however it still reached the top 20 in New Zealand and top 40 in Australia.
American Dream refers to the national ethos of the United States.

Music video 
The music video for this single was released on 28 April 2014.

Reviews
David Whiteway from Renowned For Sound gave the song 4 out 5, saying; "American Dream is a belter. [It] opens with the words "'do something with your life'" and [it has] a captivating hook and choral melody driven by massive pop sensibilities and their own excellent song writing skills. "

Jolt Magazine said: "This song is an uplifting song that begs you to listen to the lyrics about how the 'underdogs rise and the mighty fall'."

The song was also featured on an episode the Nickelodeon TV show The Thundermans, sung by MKTO themselves as guest stars. They also performed the song on the ABC American television show Good Morning America.

Charts

Certifications

References

External links

 MKTO official website

2014 singles
MKTO songs